The 2018–19 season was Partick Thistle's first season back in the Scottish Championship, following their relegation from the Scottish Premiership at the end of the 2017–18 season. Thistle also competed in the League Cup, Challenge Cup and the Scottish Cup.

Summary

Management

Partick Thistle began the season under the management of Alan Archibald who been in charge since February 2013. On the 6th October, following a poor start to the season, Archibald left his position as manager and was replaced by Gary Caldwell who was appointed on 15 October.

Results and fixtures

Pre Season

Scottish Championship

Scottish League Cup

Group stage
Results

Scottish Challenge Cup

Scottish Cup

Player statistics

|-
|colspan="12"|Players who left the club during the 2018–19 season
|-

|}

Club statistics

League table

League Cup Table

Division summary

Transfers

In

Out

Loans in

Loans out

See also
 List of Partick Thistle F.C. seasons

References

Partick Thistle F.C. seasons
Partick Thistle